Catawba Historic District is a national historic district located at Catawba, Catawba County, North Carolina. The district encompasses 48 contributing buildings and 1 contributing structure in the rural village of Catawba. It contains 19th century farmhouses and tracts of farmland with scattered outbuildings as well as village residences and a small commercial district. The district includes notable examples of Gothic Revival, Victorian, and Bungalow / American Craftsman architecture. Notable buildings include the Bagby-Danner Farmhouse, Jacob D. Little House (c. 1884), Town Hall (c. 1920, 1960s), Dr, Fred Y. Long Farm (c. 1909), Catawba ·Baptist Church (1875, 1950s), (former) Catawba High School (1921), Quintus M. Little House (c. 1873), Trollinger-Sherrill House (c. 1873), Brawley-Lowrance House (c. 1897), Pitts-Little House (1924), Manson L. Wilkinson· House (c. 1920), Sherrill Tobacco Company Building (c. 1896), Catawba Drug Company (c. 1915), Pitts-Carpenter Building (c. 1895), Long and Company Store (c. 1895), and the Methodist Church.

It was added to the National Register of Historic Places in 1986.

References

Historic districts on the National Register of Historic Places in North Carolina
Gothic Revival architecture in North Carolina
Victorian architecture in North Carolina
Buildings and structures in Catawba County, North Carolina
National Register of Historic Places in Catawba County, North Carolina